Jura may refer to:

 Jura Levy (born 1990), Jamaican sprinter
 Jura Pađen (born 1955), Croatian singer and guitarist
 Jura Soyfer (1912–1939), Austrian political journalist and cabaret writer
 Jura Stublić (born 1953), Croatian singer-songwriter

See also
 Juraj
 Jurica

Croatian masculine given names